Michael Seirton is a British set decorator. He has won an Academy Award and has been nominated for another in the category Best Art Direction. He worked on more than 30 films.

Selected filmography
Seirton won an Academy Award for Best Art Direction and has been nominated for another:
Won
 Gandhi (1982)
Nominated
 Reds (1981)

References

External links

British set decorators
Best Art Direction Academy Award winners
Year of birth missing (living people)
Living people